Chroma is a one-act contemporary ballet created by Wayne McGregor for the Royal Ballet. The work received its premiere at the Royal Opera House, Covent Garden, on 17 November 2006. The ballet is performed to a combination of original music by Joby Talbot and arrangements of music by Jack White of the White Stripes, with orchestrations by Christopher Austin. The ballet was a great success, winning a number of awards, including the Laurence Olivier Award for Best New Dance Production, and led to The Royal Ballet appointing McGregor as resident choreographer.

Production

Chroma marks the second time Wayne McGregor choreographed for the Royal Opera House main stage, having previously created works for the Royal Opera House's Linbury Studio Theatre. According to McGregor, it was created within three weeks, with four to five hours of rehearsals each day. The ballet is performed by ten dancers; some of the original cast members went on to be McGregor's frequent collaborators, such as Edward Watson, Steven McRae and Eric Underwood. The original cast also featured several Royal Ballet lead dancers, some of whom were working with McGregor for the first time. The female dancers are completely off pointe.

The music includes four pieces by British composer Joby Talbot, as well as Talbot's rearrangement of three songs by Jack White of the American rock band White Stripes, including "Aluminum", "The Hardest Button to Button", and "Blue Orchid". The set was designed by British architect John Pawson, who was known for his minimalist style. Pawson was brought in after he was approached by McGregor to create "amazing plain canvases in which anything can happen". Chroma was the first time Pawson designed for a stage.

The choreography, design, and music received critical acclaim, with The Times noting: "McGregor’s Chroma is ravishing on all fronts", and The Guardian writing that the ballet's "tension between chaos and minimalism is extreme". The success of Chroma led to McGregor's appointment as resident choreographer of the Royal Ballet, a position that was previously held by Frederick Ashton and Kenneth MacMillan, thus making him the first contemporary artist and the only one without any ballet training to hold the post.

The Royal Ballet has since revived Chroma and it has been performed on tour. Other ballet companies that have danced the piece include the National Ballet of Canada (2010), San Francisco Ballet (2011), Bolshoi Ballet (2011), and The Australian Ballet (2014). In 2013, Alvin Ailey American Dance Theater became the first modern dance troupe to perform Chroma. In 2016, on the 10th anniversary of the premiere, the Royal Ballet performed Chroma alongside five dancers from the Alvin Ailey American Dance Theater, including Jacqueline Green, Jamar Roberts and Rachael McLaren.

Casts
World premiere (2006): Federico Bonelli, Alina Cojocaru, Lauren Cuthbertson, Sarah Lamb, Steven McRae, Ludovic Ondiviela, Tamara Rojo, Eric Underwood, Edward Watson, Jonathan Watkins
Royal Ballet DVD: Federico Bonelli, Ricardo Cervera, Tamara Rojo, Mara Galeazzi, Sarah Lamb, Steven McRae, Laura Morera, Ludovic Ondiviela, Eric Underwood, Jonathan Watkins, Edward Watson
National Ballet of Canada premiere (2010): Aleksandar Antonijevic, Greta Hodgkinson, Tanya Howard, Zdenek Konvalina, Noah Long, Tina Pereira, Brendan Saye, Robert Stephen, Dylan Tedaldi, Bridgett Zehr
San Francisco Ballet premiere (2011): Frances Chung, Taras Domitro, Jaime Garcia Castilla, Dana Genshaft, Isaac Hernández, Maria Kochetkova, Pascal Molat, Garen Scribner, Anthony Spaulding, Yuan Yuan Tan
The Australian Ballet premiere (2014): Adam Bull, Juliet Burnett, Brett Chynoweth, Daniel Gaudiello, Lana Jones, Andrew Killian, Christopher Rodgers-Wilson, Amber Scott, Leanne Stojmenov, Vivienne Wong
10th anniversary revival (2016): Federico Bonelli, Jeroboam Bozeman, Lauren Cuthbertson, Jacqueline Green, Sarah Lamb, Yannick Lebrun, Rachael McLaren, Steven McRae, Calvin Richardson, Jamar Roberts

Videography
In 2011, Opus Arte released a DVD of a performance of Chroma by The Royal Ballet, along with McGregor's Infra and Limen.

In 2015, a performance by Alvin Ailey American Dance Theater at Lincoln Center, along with three other pieces, was filmed as a part of Lincoln Center at the Movies: Great American Dance, which was screened in various cinemas and was released in a DVD. The Lincoln Center released the video online in light of the impact of the COVID-19 coronavirus pandemic on the performing arts.

Awards and nominations

Notes

References

External links
Royal Opera House
Studio Wayne McGregor
Sarah Lamb on Chroma

Ballets by Wayne McGregor
Ballets by Joby Talbot
Ballets created for The Royal Ballet
2006 ballet premieres